Devonport Column is a monument designed by John Foulston in Devonport, Plymouth, England. It is situated next to Devonport Guildhall, also designed by Foulston.

History
Devonport Column was built in 1824 as part of the development of the town of Devonport,. It is 124 feet tall.

Devonport Column served as a post for firewatch duties during the Blitz with one policeman at the top and another at the bottom to relay messages.

Conservation and access
Public access was restricted in the 1950s and it closed completely in the early 1990s. 
After a grant from the Heritage Lottery Fund, it can now be climbed again via the spiral 137 stepped staircase to enjoy the view over Plymouth and Dartmoor.

Gallery

See also
Grade I listed buildings in Plymouth

References

Grade I listed buildings in Devon
Buildings and structures in Plymouth, Devon
Monumental columns in England
Regency architecture in England